National Comics may refer to:
 National Comics (series), a 1940s comic book series published by Quality Comics
 National Comics Publications, the predecessor of DC Comics